Beebe Lake /bibi/ is a reservoir in Ithaca, New York, located on the campus of Cornell University.

History

Formation
Beebe Lake was once a forested swamp. A pond was formed when Ezra Cornell constructed a dam on Fall Creek in 1838, above Triphammer Falls, to provide power to the mills owned by Jeremiah S. Beebe. Cornell constructed a tunnel 200 feet long and 15 feet high to channel the water, raising the water level 18 feet. In 1898, the dam was raised an additional ten feet, turning the pond into a proper lake.

The lake is dredged approximately once a decade in order to prevent it from returning to its original wetland state.

Winter recreation
Beebe Lake became a major local destination for winter recreation starting in the 1890s. The space was maintained by the Cornell Athletic Association but open to the public for ice skating. Ithaca Street Railway trolleys would announce that the ice was open for skating by displaying a white banner with red ball. Trolley passengers with skates rode for half price. In the Spring when the ice melted, sometimes local children would break of chunks of ice with poles, and ride the ice rafts downstream. 

A toboggan slide was a popular attraction on Beebe Lake for the first half of the 20th Century. The first one was erected around 1900 and made of wood; it was replaced by a steel slide in the 1920s. Although dangerous and costly to operate, it remained enormously popular, until Cornell removed the slide in 1949. 

In the early 20th Century, Cornell fraternities held ice castle building competitions, creating intricate structures with decorated pillars.

The lake was also Cornell's primary venue for ice hockey matches during the first decades of the sport.  However, the ice would sometimes melt just before a scheduled contest, making it an unreliable venue. In 1957 Lynah Rink was constructed, freeing the hockey team from the unpredictability of the climate.

In recent decades, the lake remains a popular spot for paddling by organizations such as the Cornell Outing Club.

References 

Cornell University
Lakes of Tompkins County, New York
Artificial lakes of the United States
1838 establishments in New York (state)